The year 2007 involved many significant scientific events and discoveries, some of which are listed below.

Events, discoveries and inventions
9 January – Apple Inc.'s first iPhone smartphone is announced by Steve Jobs at Macworld in San Francisco; it is released in the United States on 29 June.
12 January – Comet McNaught reaches perihelion and becomes visible from Earth during daylight.
14 January – Scientists at the Roslin Institute announce they have genetically engineered chickens to lay eggs containing cancer-fighting proteins.
7 February – The second "Berlin Patient", Timothy Ray Brown, is given a stem cell transplant from a donor carrying the CCR5-Δ32 allele, which cures his HIV/AIDS.
28 February – The New Horizons space probe makes a gravitational slingshot around Jupiter to change its trajectory towards Pluto.
3–4 March – A total lunar eclipse occurs, visible in some parts of the Americas and Asia, and in all of Europe and Africa.
19 March – A partial solar eclipse occurs, visible in Asia.
10 April – Spectroscopic analysis of HD 209458 b, an extrasolar planet, provides the first evidence of atmospheric water vapor beyond the Solar System.
24 April – The potentially habitable exoplanet Gliese 581 c is discovered in the constellation Libra.
27 April – US researchers simulate half a virtual mouse brain on a supercomputer.
 May – High Resolution Fly's Eye Observatory (HiRes) and Pierre Auger Observatory present their results suggesting a confirmation for the Greisen–Zatsepin–Kuzmin limit, the theoretical limit for ultra-high-energy cosmic rays interacting with the Cosmic Microwave Background.
5 June – NASA's MESSENGER spacecraft makes its second flyby of Venus en route to Mercury, which it reaches in 2011.
2 July – Venus and Saturn are in conjunction, with a separation of 46 arcseconds.
23 August – Chris Messina proposes use of the hashtag on Twitter.
28 August – A total lunar eclipse occurs, visible in some parts of the Americas and Asia, and all of Australasia and the Pacific Ocean.
11 September – A partial solar eclipse occurs, visible in southern areas of South America.
27 September – NASA's Dawn spacecraft is launched, beginning its journey to the asteroid belt objects Vesta and Ceres. It reached Vesta in 2011, and Ceres in 2015.
24 October
 Comet 17P/Holmes suddenly brightens from 17 to 2.8 magnitude.
 Chang'e 1, the first satellite in the Chinese Lunar Exploration Program, is launched from Xichang Satellite Launch Center; on 5 November it enters lunar orbit.
5 November – The Open Handset Alliance launches the Android mobile operating system.

Prizes

Abel Prize

2007 Abel Prize: S. R. Srinivasa Varadhan

Nobel Prize

2007 Nobel Prize in Physiology or Medicine: Mario Capecchi, Oliver Smithies and Martin Evans
2007 Nobel Prize in Physics: Albert Fert and Peter Grünberg
2007 Nobel Prize in Chemistry: Gerhard Ertl

Deaths

20 February – F. Albert Cotton (b. 1930), American chemist known for research on transition metal chemistry
22 February – Lucille Farrier Stickel (b. 1915), American wildlife toxicologist
23 March – Paul Cohen (b. 1934), American mathematician, winner of the 1966 Fields Medal
27 March – Paul Lauterbur (b. 1929), American chemist, winner of the 2003 Nobel Prize in Physiology or Medicine for his work in developing magnetic resonance imaging
4 April – Karen Spärck Jones (b. 1935), English computer scientist
7 July – Dame Anne McLaren (b. 1927), English developmental biologist and her ex-husband Donald Michie (b. 1923), British AI researcher (automobile accident
23 July – Ernst Otto Fischer (b. 1918), German winner of the 1973 Nobel Prize in Chemistry for pioneering work in the area of organometallic chemistry
12 August – Ralph Asher Alpher (b. 1921), American cosmologist
29 September – Katsuko Saruhashi (b. 1920), Japanese geochemist
26 October – Arthur Kornberg (b. 1918), American biochemist, winner of the 1959 Nobel Prize in Physiology or Medicine for his discovery of the mechanisms in the biological synthesis of DNA

See also
2007 in spaceflight
List of emerging technologies

References

 
21st century in science
2000s in science